Psococerastis is a genus of insects belonging to the family Psocidae.

The species of this genus are found in Europe, Southeastern Asia and Southern America.

Species:

Psococerastis albimaculata 
Psococerastis amazonica 
Psococerastis ampullaris 
Psococerastis annae 
Psococerastis asiatica 
Psococerastis aspinosa 
Psococerastis assamensis 
Psococerastis aurata 
Psococerastis baihuashanensis 
Psococerastis baishanzuica 
Psococerastis bakeri 
Psococerastis bengalensis 
Psococerastis betulisuga 
Psococerastis bispinosa 
Psococerastis bomiensis 
Psococerastis boseiensis 
Psococerastis brachyneura 
Psococerastis brachypoda 
Psococerastis breviollis 
Psococerastis callangana 
Psococerastis capitata 
Psococerastis capitulatis 
Psococerastis chebalingensis 
Psococerastis collessi 
Psococerastis cosmoptera 
Psococerastis curvivalvae 
Psococerastis cuspidata 
Psococerastis deflecta 
Psococerastis denticuligis 
Psococerastis dicoccis 
Psococerastis discalis 
Psococerastis dissidens 
Psococerastis duoipunctata 
Psococerastis emeiensis 
Psococerastis epunctata 
Psococerastis exilis 
Psococerastis fasciata 
Psococerastis fenestralis 
Psococerastis ficivorella 
Psococerastis flavistigma 
Psococerastis fluctimarginalis 
Psococerastis formosa 
Psococerastis fortunae 
Psococerastis fuelleborni 
Psococerastis galeata 
Psococerastis gansuiensis 
Psococerastis ghesquierei 
Psococerastis gibbosa 
Psococerastis golfita 
Psococerastis gracilescens 
Psococerastis guangxiensis 
Psococerastis guizhouensis 
Psococerastis hageni 
Psococerastis hainanensis 
Psococerastis huangshanensis 
Psococerastis huapingana 
Psococerastis hunanensis 
Psococerastis hunaniensis 
Psococerastis inaequimagna 
Psococerastis joannisi 
Psococerastis kurokiana 
Psococerastis lassbergi 
Psococerastis lifashengi 
Psococerastis linearis 
Psococerastis lombokensis 
Psococerastis luroris 
Psococerastis luzonensis 
Psococerastis macrotaenialis 
Psococerastis magniprocessus 
Psococerastis mali 
Psococerastis malleata 
Psococerastis martensi 
Psococerastis melanostigma 
Psococerastis microdonta 
Psococerastis moganshanensis 
Psococerastis murudensis 
Psococerastis nepalensis 
Psococerastis nigriventris 
Psococerastis nilae 
Psococerastis nirvana 
Psococerastis opulenta 
Psococerastis orientalis 
Psococerastis pandurata 
Psococerastis paraguayana 
Psococerastis parallelica 
Psococerastis parasinensis 
Psococerastis pelesi 
Psococerastis pellucidatis 
Psococerastis phanerosticta 
Psococerastis pictiventris 
Psococerastis pingtangensis 
Psococerastis pingxiangensis 
Psococerastis platynota 
Psococerastis platypis 
Psococerastis platyraphis 
Psococerastis platytaenia 
Psococerastis plicata 
Psococerastis polygonalis 
Psococerastis polystictis 
Psococerastis protractis 
Psococerastis psaronipunctata 
Psococerastis punctulosa 
Psococerastis pyralina 
Psococerastis pyralinella 
Psococerastis pyriformis 
Psococerastis quadrisecta 
Psococerastis quinidentata 
Psococerastis rhondae 
Psococerastis ryukyuensis 
Psococerastis sangzhiensis 
Psococerastis scissilis 
Psococerastis sexpunctata 
Psococerastis shanxiensis 
Psococerastis shennongjiana 
Psococerastis sinensis 
Psococerastis spatiosis 
Psococerastis stictica 
Psococerastis stipularis 
Psococerastis stulticaulis 
Psococerastis taprobanes 
Psococerastis thomasseti 
Psococerastis tianmushanensis 
Psococerastis tibetensis 
Psococerastis tokyoensis 
Psococerastis trichotoma 
Psococerastis trilobata 
Psococerastis turriformis 
Psococerastis urceolaris 
Psococerastis venigra 
Psococerastis venimaculis 
Psococerastis weijuni 
Psococerastis yunnanensis 
Psococerastis yuwan 
Psococerastis zambeziana 
Psococerastis zayuensis 
Psococerastis zhaoi

References

Psocidae
Psocoptera genera